Danila Valeryevich Kozlovsky (born 3 May 1985) is a Russian actor and director.

Biography

Early life and career
Kozlovsky was born in Moscow. His mother, Nadezhda Zvenigorodskaya, is a stage actress, and his father, Valery Kozlovsky, was a professor at Moscow State University specializing in marketing and mass communications. He is the middle boy in a three boys family, has an older brother, Yegor, and a younger brother, Ivan. From a young age, Danila was placed in dance and music classes, learning to play the saxophone and the alto. During his early years, he frequently changed schools, potentially due to discipline issues. He made his big screen debut in 1998, playing the troubled sixth grader Denis on the Russian television series Simple Truths.

In 1996, he was accepted into the Kronshtadt Naval Military School, which he attended until his graduation in 2002. Upon graduation, he matriculated to the Saint Petersburg State Theatre Arts Academy, entering the acting/directing course supervised by Lev Dodin. During his fourth year he made his debut on the stage of the Little Drama Theatre (Theatre de l’Europe), playing the part of Edgar in King Lear (2006). The role brought him his first theatre award: a special prize of Expert Council of the "Golden Sofit" (the top-rated theatre award in Saint Petersburg) for Best Debut. Then there was a role in the play Life and Fate, which premiered in Paris and the diploma performance "Warsaw Melody".

After graduating from the academy in 2007, Danila Kozlovskiy was officially admitted to the staff of the Little Drama Theatre (Theatre de l'Europe). In his repertoire were added performances Lord of the Flies, where he played Ralph, Intrigue and Love and The Cherry Orchard.

In 2005, he also received his first important film role – in the picture Garpastum. The film, set during the time of the First World War, tells the story of two brothers who wish to build their own football stadium. Kozlovsky received the Russian Guild of Film Critics "White Elephant Award" for the best male lead actor.

Kozlovsky gained wider publicity in 2008 with his starring role in the film Black Hunters. There he played the role of robber archaeologist Sergei Filatov, who is transported into the past together with his friends when making illegal excavations.

In 2009, he portrayed drag queen Lusya in the comedy-drama Jolly Fellows. It was screened in the Panorama section of the 2010 Berlin International Film Festival.

In 2011, he appeared as Marcus Blackwell in Need for Speed: The Run.

Soulless and breakthrough

After Kozlovsky starred in the 2012 film Soulless he became a household name in Russia. He played the lead role of Max Andreev, a young ambitious executive manager who begins to reevaluate his priorities in life and career. The film was a hit and grossed $13 million. He received the National Golden Eagle Award for Soulless (2012, nomination "Best Cinema Actor"). The film was followed by a sequel in 2015, for which he won the Nika Award as best actor.

Kozlovsky played the role of Yegor Dorin, in the 2012 film The Spy, based on the Boris Akunin novel.

In 2013, he portrayed ice-hockey player Valeri Kharlamov in the sports drama Legend № 17. The film was a critical and box-office success, earning $29.5 million at the box-office.

Danila starred in his first Hollywood film in 2014; he played Dimitri Belikov in the comedy-horror picture Vampire Academy.

The year 2016 saw Kozlovsky star in five films – romantic comedy Status: non engaged, sci-fi action film Hardcore Henry, comedy film Friday, disaster film Flight Crew and historical action film Viking.

Out of the aforementioned films, the most popular ones at the box-office were Flight Crew, earning $27 million, and Viking which grossed $34 million.

He played Count Vorontzov in the film Matilda (2017), which told the story of the romance between Emperor Nicholas II and ballerina Mathilde Kschessinska. The film became controversial after State Duma deputy Natalia Poklonskaya led a campaign to ban the film on religious grounds.

Also in 2017, it was announced that Kozlovsky will appear as Oleg of Novgorod in the sixth season of popular Canadian historical drama Vikings.

In 2018, Kozlovsky played a supporting role in Dovlatov. The biographical picture about writer Sergei Dovlatov premiered at the 2018 Berlinale in competition.

Danila Kozlovsky's directorial debut Coach was released in 2018.

In the media
In 2013, GQ Russia picked Danila Kozlovsky as Man of the Year.

Kozlovsky appeared in advertisements for Chanel's Coco Mademoiselle alongside Keira Knightley in 2015.

For a number of years, he was cited as a sex symbol by various media outlets in Russia.

Personal life
In late 2008, Danila married the Maly Drama Theatre actress Urszula Małka. They divorced in 2011. Kozlovsky was in a relationship with actress and model Olga Zueva from 2014 to 2020. They split shortly after Olga gave birth to their daughter Oda Valentina Zueva (born in March 2020).

On 24 and 27 February 2022, Kozlovsky posted several Instagram posts condemning the 2022 Russian invasion of Ukraine, sharing an image of a crying refugee. In his 27 February post, Kozlovsky admitted to, and apologized for, his indifference to the annexation of Crimea by the Russian Federation in 2014. Kozlovsky's film Viking had been filmed in parts of the Russia-annexed territory of Crimea.

Theater

Little Drama Theatre (Theatre de l’Europe)
2006 – King Lear – Edgar
2006 – Whim – Barkalov, the manager of the estate
2007 – The Warsaw Melody – Victor
2007 – Life and Fate – Novikov
2009 – The Lord of the Flies – Ralph
2010 – Lorenzaccio – Lorenzaccio
2012 – Intrigue and Love – Ferdinand
2013 – The Cherry Orchard – Lopakhin
2016 – Hamlet – Hamlet

Theater Post
2012 – Shoot / Get Treasure / Repeat by Mark Ravenhill, director Dmitri Volktostrelov – Dictator

Filmography

Film and Television

Video game

Awards and nominations

References

External links 

 
 

1985 births
21st-century Russian male actors
Living people
Male actors from Moscow
Russian State Institute of Performing Arts alumni
Recipients of the Nika Award
Russian film directors
Russian male film actors
Russian male stage actors
Russian male television actors
Russian activists against the 2022 Russian invasion of Ukraine